Scarface or Scar (2007 – 11 June 2021) was a male lion from Masai Mara, Kenya. He was often described as the "World's Most Famous Lion." The name was given to him after he injured his right eye in a fight over the Marsh Pride territory. Scar, along with his brothers Sikio, Hunter, and Morani won the Marsh Pride in 2012.

Death 

Discover Wildlife reported that Scarface died of old age and starvation at 1:00 pm (Kenya time), 11 June 2021, in around the Reserve in the Ashnil.

See also 
 P-22 (mountain lion)

References

External links 
 Watch Scarface on Nat Geo WILD

2007 animal births
2021 animal deaths
Individual lions
Individual wild animals